Belait CSS-1 is a well intervention vessel and Accommodation platform owned by Belait Shipping. She can provide places for accommodations, and perform maintenance, rescue, and hoist activities. She has a sister ship named Belait CSS-2, commissioned four years after CSS-1.

Construction and career 
Construction of Belait CSS-1 was commissioned by Belait CSS Sendirian Berhad, an SPV Company registered in Brunei Darussalam. Belait CSS-1 was primarily built as a well-intervention vessel to support production of oil in Brunei. She cost about 526 million yuan ($80 million), was built in Fujian, China and registered in Muara, Brunei.

Belait CSS-1'' was undocked from the shipyard on 7 December 2013 and delivered to Brunei on 25 February 2015. She regularly travels to the  Champion Field, which is a complex oil and gas field, situated 40 kilometres north-northwest of Bandar Seri Begawan, in water depths of 10 to 45 metres. She usually docks in Muara Port, Brunei after every return voyages.

Equipments 
The CSS is a multi-function well-intervention, supply, and light construction vessel, with accommodation for workers. It is equipped with a 150 T lattice boom crane, a telescopic heave compensated gangway, a moonpool, a 12.8 T rated helideck, DP-2 rating, and accommodation up to 200 people.

She was designed by Vard Marine. The CSS is a cost-effective, stable platform with most of the capabilities of much larger vessels at a far lower cost. In addition, the design can be built at shipyards around the world.

Gallery

References 

Ships of Brunei
Ships built in China
2000s ships
Diesel engines
Diesel engine technology
Brunei–China relations